Combined Motor Holdings Limited (CMH) is a South African-based investment holding company engaged primarily in distribution and franchising; motor retailers; car hire and financial and support services sectors in South Africa.

Combined Motor Holdings Limited is a JSE-listed Public Retail Company.

CMH's business units include First Car Rental, Green Machine, NWE Workshop Equipment, CMH Fleet Solutions. 
The company's headquarters are located in Umhlanga, north of Durban in KwaZulu-Natal, South Africa.

History
Combined Motor Holdings was founded by Jebb McIntosh and Maldwyn Zimmerman in 1976. The company began as a Chevrolet and Datsun franchise motor dealership, based in KwaZulu-Natal.

In 1987, Combined Motor Holdings was listed on the Johannesburg Stock Exchange.

In 1999, Combined Motor Holdings acquired the franchise for the international vehicle rental groups National and Alamo and restructured the companies as National Alamo within Combined Motor Holdings. In 2008, CMH restructured its car rental business again, registering the subsidiary First Car Rental and also acquiring a service contract to operate the Germany-based, Sixt rent a car, in South Africa.

In 2006, Thebe Investment Corporation, a Black Economic Empowerment company based in South Africa, acquired a 15% stake in Combined Motor Holdings for R294 million, the equivalent of R93 per share.

Company structure
CMH has five primary areas of business, including:

Distribution and franchising

NWE Workshop Equipment

NWE Workshop Equipment is a supplier of bulk lubrication management systems, workshop equipment and bulk oil management systems in South Africa. NWE Workshop Equipment is located in Pinetown, Durban, South Africa.
 
CMH Fleet Solutions

CMH Fleet Solutions is the fleet division of Combined Motor Holdings Limited. The company engages in fleet leasing, maintenance, fuel management, accident management, fleet administration, driver management and security.

Motor dealerships

Combined Motor Holdings Limited is a licensed dealer for several automotive brands in South Africa, including: 
CMH Commercial (commercial truck dealership)
CMH Datsun
CMH Ford
CMH Haval
CMH Honda
CMH Isuzu
CMH Jaguar
CMH Land Rover
CMH Lexus
CMH Mazda
CMH Mitsubishi
CMH Nissan
CMH Opel
CMH Renault
CMH Subaru
CMH Suzuki
CMH Toyota
CMH Volvo

Vehicle hire

First Car Rental

First Car Rental is the car rental subsidiary of Combined Motor Holdings Limited. First Car Rental operates out of 49 branches in South Africa. First Car Rental is a SAVRALA member (South African Vehicle Rental and Leasing Association). The company is listed as one of the Top 500 Best Managed Companies in South Africa. First Car Rental is the winner of the 2012 and 2013 South African Service Awards.

See also 
List of companies traded on the JSE
List of companies of South Africa
Economy of South Africa

References

External links
 

Car rental companies of South Africa
Companies based in Durban
Companies listed on the Johannesburg Stock Exchange
Financial services companies established in 1976
South African companies established in 1976